The Iona Group is a sequence of metamorphosed Neoproterozoic sedimentary rocks that outcrop along the east coast of the island of Iona within the Inner Hebrides of Scotland. It is traditionally regarded as part of the Torridonian succession.

Three divisions are recognised; i) interbedded metasandstones and metasiltstones, ii) slaty semipelites and iii) conglomerates, the clasts of which are largely metamorphic in origin. The rock strata are steeply inclined to vertical.

References

Geology of Scotland